Die, as a verb, refers to death, the cessation of life. 

Die may also refer to:

Games
 Die, singular of dice, small throwable objects used for producing random numbers

Manufacturing
 Die (integrated circuit), a rectangular piece of a semiconductor wafer 
 Die (manufacturing), a material-shaping device
 Die (philately)
 Coin die, a metallic piece used to strike a coin
 Die casting, a material-shaping process
 Sort (typesetting), a cast die for printing
 Die cutting (web), process of using a die to shear webs of low-strength materials
 Die, a tool used in paper embossing
 Tap and die, cutting tools used to create screw threads in solid substances
 Tool and die, the occupation of making dies

Arts and media

Music
 Die (album), the seventh studio album by rapper Necro
 Die (musician), Japanese musician, guitarist of the band Dir en grey
 DJ Die, British DJ and musician with Reprazent
 "DiE", a 2013 single by the Japanese idol group BiS
 die!, an inactive German Neue Deutsche Härte band

Other uses in arts and media
 Die (film), a 2010 thriller film directed by Dominic James
 Die (comics), a comic book series and role-playing game by Kieron Gillen and illustrated by Stephanie Hans

Other uses
 Die, a grammar article, in the Afrikaans and German languages
 Die, Drôme, a town in France
 Duplication is evil, a programming motto
 German Development Institute, a German think tank for multilateral development policy

See also
 Dai (disambiguation)
 Di (disambiguation)
 Dié (disambiguation)
 Dies (disambiguation)
 Dice (disambiguation)
 Dicing
 Dye